N. cornutus may refer to:
 Neobrettus cornutus, a spider species in the genus Neobrettus
 Nesodon cornutus, an extinct mammal species
 Notropis cornutus, a fish species

See also
 Cornutus (disambiguation)